In mathematics, the Z function is a function used for studying the Riemann zeta function along the critical line where the argument is one-half. It is also called the Riemann–Siegel Z function, the Riemann–Siegel zeta function, the Hardy function, the Hardy Z function and  the Hardy zeta function. It can be defined in terms of the Riemann–Siegel theta function and the Riemann zeta function by

 

It follows from the functional equation of the Riemann zeta function that the Z function is real for real values of t. It is an even function, and real analytic for real values. It follows from the fact that the Riemann-Siegel theta function and the Riemann zeta function are both holomorphic in the critical strip, where the imaginary part of t is between −1/2 and 1/2, that the Z function is holomorphic in the critical strip also. Moreover, the real zeros of Z(t) are precisely the zeros of the zeta function along the critical line, and complex zeros in the Z function critical strip correspond to zeros off the critical line of the Riemann zeta function in its critical strip.

The Riemann–Siegel formula

Calculation of the value of Z(t) for real t, and hence of the zeta function along the critical line, is greatly expedited by the Riemann–Siegel formula. This formula tells us

where the error term R(t) has a complex asymptotic expression in terms of the function

and its derivatives. If ,  and  then

where the ellipsis indicates we may continue on to higher and increasingly complex terms.

Other efficient series for Z(t) are known, in particular several using the incomplete gamma function. If

then an especially nice example is

Behavior of the Z function

From the critical line theorem, it follows that the density of the real zeros of the Z function is

for some constant c > 2/5. Hence, the number of zeros in an interval of a given size slowly increases. If the Riemann hypothesis is true, all of the zeros in the critical strip are real zeros, and the constant c is one. It is also postulated that all of these zeros are simple zeros.

An Omega theorem

Because of the zeros of the Z function, it exhibits oscillatory behavior. It also slowly grows both on average and in peak value. For instance, we have, even without the Riemann hypothesis, the Omega theorem that

where the notation means that  divided by the function within the Ω does not tend to zero with increasing t.

Average growth

The average growth of the Z function has also been much studied. We can find the root mean square (abbreviated RMS) average from 

or 

This estimate can be improved to 

If we increase the exponent, we get an average value which depends more on the peak values of Z. For fourth powers, we have

from which we may conclude that the fourth root of the mean fourth power grows as

The Lindelöf hypothesis

Higher even powers have been much studied, but less is known about the corresponding average value. It is conjectured, and follows from the Riemann hypothesis, that

for every positive ε. Here the little "o" notation means that the left hand side divided by the right hand side does converge to zero; in other words little o is the negation of Ω. This conjecture is called the Lindelöf hypothesis, and is weaker than the Riemann hypothesis. It is normally stated in an important equivalent form, which is

in either form it tells us the rate of growth of the peak values cannot be too high. The best known bound on this rate of growth is not strong, telling us that any  is suitable. It would be astonishing to find that the Z function grew anywhere close to as fast as this. Littlewood proved that on the Riemann hypothesis,
 

and this seems far more likely.

References

External links
 
 Wolfram Research – Riemann-Siegel function Z (includes function plotting and evaluation)

Zeta and L-functions